James M. Cumpston (1837 – May 24, 1888) was a Union Army soldier during the American Civil War. He received the Medal of Honor for gallantry during the Valley Campaigns of 1864. Although his military records are under Cumpston, his surname is correctly spelled Compston.

Medal of Honor citation
The President of the United States of America, in the name of Congress, takes pleasure in presenting the Medal of Honor to Private James M. Cumpston, United States Army, for extraordinary heroism from August to November, 1864, while serving with Company D, 91st Ohio Infantry, in action in the Shenandoah Valley Campaign, Virginia, for capture of flag.

See also

List of Medal of Honor recipients
List of American Civil War Medal of Honor recipients: A–F

References

External links
Military Times Hall of Valor
 Findagrave entry

1837 births
1888 deaths
People from Gallia County, Ohio
People of Ohio in the American Civil War
Union Army soldiers
United States Army Medal of Honor recipients
American Civil War recipients of the Medal of Honor